The Frankfurt Radio Symphony is the radio orchestra of Hessischer Rundfunk, the public broadcasting network of the German state of Hesse. From 1929 to 1950 it was named Frankfurter Rundfunk-Symphonie-Orchester. From 1950 to 1971 the orchestra was named Sinfonie-Orchester des Hessischen Rundfunks, from then to 2005 Radio-Sinfonie-Orchester Frankfurt. Prior to 2015, the English translation Frankfurt Radio Symphony Orchestra was used for international tours.

The orchestra's range of musical styles includes the classical-romantic repertoire, discoveries in experimental new music, concerts for children and young people and demanding programming concepts.

History 

Hans Rosbaud, its first conductor, put his stamp on the orchestra's orientation up to the year 1937 by focusing not only on traditional music but also contemporary compositions. Lindbergh's Flight was a piece of music specially commissioned for Radio performed by the orchestra with a text by Bertolt Brecht and music by Paul Hindemith and Kurt Weill and produced by Ernst Hardt. 

After World War II, Kurt Schröder and Winfried Zillig committed themselves to rebuilding the orchestra and a broad musical repertoire. Dean Dixon and Eliahu Inbal turned the ensemble into an internationally acclaimed orchestra in the three decades from 1961 to 1990. The status of the orchestra has been repeatedly confirmed, especially during the "Inbal Era", with guest appearances around the world and major editions of recorded music, such as the very first recordings of the original versions of Anton Bruckner's Third, Fourth and Eighth Symphonies, awarded the Grand Prix du Disque, and the first digital recording of all of Gustav Mahler's symphonies, which won the Deutscher Schallplattenpreis (German Record Award) in 1988. Inbal, who was chief conductor from 1974 to 1990, has been elected its conductor laureate since 1996.

From 1990 to 1996, Dmitri Kitajenko was chief conductor of the Frankfurt Radio Symphony Orchestra. His work focused on the German and Russian traditions, as well as modern styles. The piano concertos of Sergei Prokofiev, with Vladimir Krainev, and a series of works by Alexander Scriabin are but two of his projects documented on CD. Under Kitajenko, the Frankfurt Radio Symphony took extensive tours to such places as South America, Switzerland, the United States, and Japan. Under the baton of Cristóbal Halffter, a CD project of his complete orchestral works was begun, as was a series of the orchestral works of the Second Viennese School in conjunction with the symphonies of Robert Schumann and Brahms with Inbal. Arnold Schoenberg's one-act opera, Von heute auf morgen (From one day to the next), with Michael Gielen, was released as a film by Jean-Marie Straub and Danièle Huillet and on CD.

The American conductor Hugh Wolff was chief conductor of the Frankfurt Radio Symphony Orchestra from 1997 to 2006. "Flexibility" and "variety" were two important themes in his work with the orchestra. Wolff applied the experience of historical performance practices to the modern symphony orchestra, thereby regaining repertoire from the vast worlds of classical, early classical and baroque periods, as well as enriching the ensemble's literature in more contemporary aspects. The success of exciting interpretations and an unusually versatile programming were the trade marks of the collaboration of the Frankfurt Radio Symphony Orchestra and Hugh Wolff. This success was reflected in the documentation of concert projects which reach far beyond the Hessian state and are resulting in guest appearances throughout Europe, Asia and North America.

The Estonian Paavo Järvi held the position of music director for the Frankfurt Radio Symphony Orchestra from 2006 to 2013 and assumed the position of conductor laureate at the beginning of the 2013–2014 season. Paavo Järvi enriched the orchestra with new musical aspects: for example through his commitment to Nordic repertoire and great Romantic and post-Romantic literature. Paavo Järvi has enjoyed continued success with the Frankfurt Radio Symphony Orchestra on an international level and together they have worked intensively to produce an extensive catalog of critically acclaimed recordings, which include Brahms' Ein deutsches Requiem, Piano Concertos No. 1 and No. 2 (with Nicholas Angelich), the Cello Concertos by Dvořák and Herbert (with Gautier Capuçon), which was awarded the ECHO Klassik, as well as Hindemith's Trauermusik and Der Schwanendreher (with Antoine Tamestit) and the Violin Concerto (with Frank Peter Zimmermann), which was awarded the Preis der deutschen Schallplattenkritik, the quarterly critics choice award. The same prize was also received for their recordings of the Mendelssohn and Schumann Violin Concertos (with Christian Tetzlaff). Additional recordings include the symphony No. 2 and selected symphonic movements by Mahler, Mozart's Piano Concertos K. 467 and K. 595 (with Lars Vogt), Hans Rott's Symphony No. 1, the Shostakovich Piano Concertos (with Alexander Toradze) and Erkki-Sven Tüür's Symphony No. 7 and Piano Concerto (with Laura Mikkola), as well as a CD with pieces by Kagel, Furrer, Widmann and Ruzicka. Paavo Järvi and the Frankfurt Radio Symphony Orchestra have also recorded complete Bruckner and Nielsen cycles for CD and a complete Mahler cycle for DVD. 

Colombian conductor Andrés Orozco-Estrada became the orchestra's music director in 2014.

In December 2019, the orchestra announced the appointment of Alain Altinoglu as its next chief conductor, effective with the 2021–2022 season, with an initial contract of three years.

Principal conductors 

1929–1937 Hans Rosbaud
1937–1945 Otto Frickhoeffer
1946–1953 Kurt Schröder
1955–1961 
1961–1974 Dean Dixon
1974–1990 Eliahu Inbal
1990–1997 Dmitri Kitajenko
1997–2006 Hugh Wolff
2006–2013 Paavo Järvi
2014–2021 Andrés Orozco-Estrada
2021– Alain Altinoglu

Recent discography 
 Richard Strauss – Salome. Andrés Orozco-Estrada, Frankfurt Radio Symphony. PENTATONE PTC 5186602. (2017)
 Richard Strauss – Ein Heldenleben / Macbeth. Andrés Orozco-Estrada, Frankfurt Radio Symphony. PENTATONE PTC 5186582 (2016)
 Igor Stravinsky – The Rite of Spring & The Firebird (Suite 1919). Andrés Orozco-Estrada, Frankfurt Radio Symphony. PENTATONE PTC 5186556 (2016)
 Saint-Saëns – Symphonies No. 1 & 2. Eliahu Inbal, Frankfurt Radio Symphony. PENTATONE PTC 5186157 (2005)
 Vincenzo Bellini, Ignaz Moscheles, Bernard Molique, Julius Rietz, Antonio Vivaldi. Works for Oboe and Flute. Heinz Holliger, Aurèle Nicolet, Eliahu Inbal, Frankfurt Radio Symphony. PENTATONE PTC 5186129 (2004)
 Rachmaninov – Piano Concerto No. 2 & Rhapsody on a theme by Paganini. Werner Haas, Eliahu Inbal, Frankfurt Radio Symphony PENTATONE PTC 5186114 (2003)

References

External links 

  ]
 hr-Sinfonieorchester YouTube Channel

German symphony orchestras
Hessischer Rundfunk
Musical groups established in 1929
1929 establishments in Germany
Radio and television orchestras